Harley Park Parker (June 14, 1872 – March 3, 1941) was a pitcher in Major League Baseball who played from  through  for the Chicago Colts (1893, 1895–1896) and Cincinnati Reds (1901). He was born in Theresa, New York. His younger brother, Jay Parker, also played in the majors.

In a four-season career, Parker posted a 5–8 record with 24 strikeouts and a 5.90 ERA in 18 appearances, including 14 starts, 13 complete games, one shutout, one save, and  innings of work. Parker was responsible for one of the worst pitching performances in Major League Baseball history. Playing for the Reds against the Brooklyn Superbas on 21 June 1901, Parker gave up 26 hits in the Superbas' 21–3 win. He umpired in the National League during the  season.

Parker died in Chicago, at the age of 68.

References

External links
Baseball Reference
Retrosheet

Chicago Colts players
Cincinnati Reds players
Major League Baseball pitchers
Baseball players from New York (state)
1872 births
1941 deaths
19th-century baseball players
Grand Rapids Rippers players
Jacksonville Jacks players
Grand Rapids Gold Bugs players
Minneapolis Millers (baseball) players
Buffalo Bisons (minor league) players
Grand Rapids Furniture Makers players
People from Theresa, New York